Roberto Jesús García Messuti is a Venezuelan telenovela actor. He was born in Caracas on 10 January 1972.

Biography
Roberto developed an interest in acting since a young age. In 1989, he graduated from Colegio La Salle La Colina with a Bachelor in Humanities. In 1995, he received the title of Economist from the Universidad Santa María and later obtained a Certificate in Speech from the Central University of Venezuela.

His first acting debut came in 1997 in the telenovela produced by RCTV titled Llovizna.

Telenovelas
 Las Bandidas (2013) as Tulio Irazabal
 Válgame Dios (2012) as Cayo Castillo Rodriguez
 Dulce Amargo (2012) as David
 La viuda joven (2011) as Matias Humboldt
 Toda una dama (2007) as Ignacio Caballeros
 Amor a Palos (2005) as Rene Cardenas
 ¡Qué buena se puso Lola! (2004) as Oscar Aguirre
 Engañada (2003) as Sergio Monasterios
 Mambo y canela (2002) as Yonson
 Hechizo de Amor (2000) as Silvio Pérez
 Cuando Hay Pasion (1999) as Juan Carlos
 Llovizna (1997) as Eloy
 Destino de Mujer (1997) as Augusto

References

External links
 
 Artistas venezolanos crean movimiento en apoyo al Gobierno retrieved from 

Living people
1972 births
Male actors from Caracas
Venezuelan male telenovela actors
Universidad Santa María (Venezuela) alumni